K. P. Prabhakaran Nair is an Indian agronomist. He was formerly a senior fellow of the Alexander von Humboldt Foundation, and is the chairman of an independent committee of experts appointed by the Supreme Court to investigate Bt brinjal.. He even  wrote his articles for newspapers about issues concerning about agriculture in India.

Books 

Nair's books include:
The Agronomy and Economy of Turmeric and Ginger
The Agronomy and Economy of Black pepper and Cardamom
The Agronomy and Economy of imported Tree Crops of the Developing Countries

References 

Agriculture in India
Living people
Year of birth missing (living people)